Martin Bidař (born 24 February 1999) is a Czech pair skater, who currently competes with Jelizaveta Žuková. They are two-time Czech national champions (2020–2021) and represented the Czech Republic at the 2022 Winter Olympics.

With former partner Anna Dušková, he is the 2016 World Junior champion, 2016 Youth Olympic silver medalist (individually and in the team event), and 2015 JGP Final silver medalist. Dušková/Bidař represented the Czech Republic at the 2018 Winter Olympics.

Personal life 
Martin Bidař was born on 24 February 1999 in České Budějovice, Czech Republic. He is the son of a figure skating coach, Iveta Bidařová, and the younger brother of a former pair skater, Petr Bidař. His sisters were also figure skaters.

Skating career

Early years 
Martin Bidař started learning to skate in 2003. Originally single skaters, he and Anna Dušková began skating together as a pair after their coach, Eva Horklová, suggested the idea. Recalling their beginnings, Dušková stated, "It was quite embarrassing at first because everybody was skating singles, and we had to hold hands. We were so young and shy." In the 2011–2012 season, they competed on the novice national level.

2013–2014 season: Junior international debut 
Dušková/Bidař's ISU Junior Grand Prix (JGP) debut came in the 2013–2014 season; they finished eighth in September 2013 in Košice, Slovakia, and sixth the next month in Ostrava, Czech Republic. In March 2014, the pair placed tenth at the World Junior Championships in Sofia, Bulgaria, having ranked tenth in both segments.

2014–2015 season 
In 2014–2015, Dušková/Bidař continued on the JGP series, finishing tenth in Estonia and eighth in Germany. They came in eighth at the 2015 World Junior Championships in Tallinn, Estonia, after placing ninth in both segments.

2015–2016 season: World Junior champions 
Although based mainly in the Czech Republic, Dušková/Bidař also spent some time training in Montreal and Sochi in the summer of 2015 and made another visit to Montreal during the competitive season.

Competing in the 2015 JGP series, Dušková/Bidař won a silver medal in August in Linz, Austria, and finished fourth the following month in Riga, Latvia. The results qualified them for the 2015 JGP Final, held in December 2015 in Barcelona, Spain. Ranked third in the short program and second in the free skate, Dušková/Bidař edged out Russia's Atakhanova/Spiridonov by 0.33 for the silver medal behind Borisova/Sopot, who won gold by a margin of 9.53 points. They became the first Czech pair to step on the podium at a JGP Final.

In February 2016, Dušková/Bidař competed in Hamar, Norway, at the Winter Youth Olympics, placing first in the short program, second in the free skate, and second overall with a total score 2.53 less than Borisova/Sopot. Their silver is the Czech Republic's first Youth Olympic medal in figure skating. In March, Dušková/Bidař won gold at the 2016 World Junior Championships in Debrecen, Hungary. Ranked first in both segments, they outscored two Russian pairs – silver medalists Mishina/Mirzoev by 9.22 points and bronze medalists Borisova]]/Sopot by 12.82 points – to become the Czech Republic's first World Junior champions in figure skating. They are also the first pairs skaters from outside China, Russia, or the United States to win the competition since 2001. On their future plans, Dušková stated that "there will be less and less singles competitions for me. We will concentrate on pairs."

2016–2017 season: Senior debut 
Ahead of the season, Dušková/Bidař spent three weeks training in Montreal before returning to the Czech Republic. Opening their season on the JGP series, the pair won gold at their September event in Ostrava, ahead of Atakhanova/Spiridonov, and then silver the following month in Dresden, behind Mishina/Mirzoev. Later in October, making their senior international debut, they outscored Austrians Ziegler/Kiefer to win the International Cup of Nice. In December, they placed second to Mishina/Mirzoev at the JGP Final in Marseille.

Dušková/Bidař placed seventh at the 2017 European Championships in Ostrava and fourteenth at the 2017 World Championships in Helsinki.

2017–2018 season: Pyeongchang Olympics, end of Duškova/Bidař 
In September 2017, Dušková/Bidař competed at the Nebelhorn Trophy, the final qualifying opportunity for the 2018 Winter Olympics. The pair placed ninth and earned a spot for the Czech Republic in the pairs event at the Olympics.

Dušková injured a knee ligament during a warm-up before training in late October and decided to undergo an operation later. As a result, the pair withdrew from their two Grand Prix assignments – the 2017 Cup of China and 2017 Internationaux de France.

Dušková/Bidař returned to competition at the 2018 Winter Olympics in Pyeongchang, South Korea. They qualified for the free skate by placing fifteenth in the short program and went on to finish fourteenth overall. Ranked thirteenth in the short and eleventh in the free, the pair finished eleventh at the 2018 World Championships in Milan, Italy. On 27 April 2018, they announced that they had parted ways.

2018–2019 Season: Partnership with Abrazhevich 
On 25 September 2018, it was announced that Martin Bidař partnered with Hanna Abrazhevich of Belarus. They finished eighteenth at the 2019 World Championships. On 17 May 2019, they announced the end of their partnership.

2019–2020 season: Debut of Zhuk/Bidař 
On 26 June 2019, Bidař announced a new partnership with Russian pair skater Elizaveta Zhuk. They competed exclusively domestically in their first season together, winning the Czech national title.

2020–2021 season 
With the COVID-19 pandemic limiting international opportunities, Zhuk/Bidař made their debut internationally at the 2020 CS Nebelhorn Trophy, one of only four pairs on the preliminary entry list. They were fifth in the short, fourth in the free, and fourth overall.  They subsequently competed at the 2021 World Championships, placing fifteenth and, in the process, qualifying for a berth for a Czech pair at the 2022 Winter Olympics.

2021–2022 season: Beijing Olympics 
In September, the Czech federation officially named Zhuk/Bidař to the Czech Olympic team. They made their debut at the 2021 CS Finlandia Trophy, where they placed ninth. They later competed at a second Challenger event, finishing twelfth at the 2021 CS Warsaw Cup.

Zhuk opted to restyle her name as Jelizaveta Žuková in advance of the Olympics. Žuková/Bidař made their European Championships debut in Tallinn, finishing in twelfth place.

Žuková/Bidař began the 2022 Winter Olympics as the Czech entries in the pairs' short program Olympic team event, where they placed eighth of nine, earning three points for the Czech team. Team Czech Republic did not advance to the next stage of the competition and finished eighth overall. With two falls in the short program of the pairs event, they finished seventeenth and were the first team to miss qualification for the free skate. Žuková sustained an ankle injury in training, as a result of which they did not compete at the 2022 World Championships.

2022–2023 season 
Žuková/Bidař were eighth at the 2022 CS Nebelhorn Trophy to start the season before placing sixth at the 2022 Skate Canada International.

Programs

With Zhuk

With Abrazhevich

With Dušková

Competitive highlights 
GP: Grand Prix; CS: Challenger Series; JGP: Junior Grand Prix

With Zhuk

With Abrazhevich

With Dušková

Single skating

Detailed results

With Zhuk

References

External links 

 
 
 

1999 births
Living people
Czech male pair skaters
Sportspeople from České Budějovice
Figure skaters at the 2016 Winter Youth Olympics
Figure skaters at the 2018 Winter Olympics
Figure skaters at the 2022 Winter Olympics
Olympic figure skaters of the Czech Republic
World Junior Figure Skating Championships medalists